Leggett (formerly Leggett Valley) is a census-designated place in Mendocino County, California, United States. It is home to some of the largest trees in the world. The nearby Smithe Redwoods State Natural Reserve and Standish-Hickey State Recreation Area are noted for their forests of coastal redwoods. The population of Leggett was 77 at the 2020 census, down from 122 at the 2010 census.

The community is served by California's State Route 1, whose northern terminus with U.S. Route 101 is just outside the center of town.

The town of Leggett includes a single gas station, United States Post Office, 1-12 school, a small grocery store, restaurant, full-service mechanic (ask a local), fire station and the Drive-Thru Tree.

The Leggett post office was dedicated in 1969.

Geography

Leggett is in northwestern Mendocino County, in the valley of the South Fork Eel River. California State Route 1 has its northern terminus at US 101 in Leggett and leads southwest  to Westport on the Pacific Ocean.

Climate
The region experiences warm (but not hot) and dry summers, with no average monthly temperatures above .  According to the Köppen Climate Classification system, Leggett has a warm-summer Mediterranean climate, abbreviated "Csb" on climate maps.

Demographics
The 2010 United States Census reported that Leggett had a population of 122. The racial makeup of Leggett was 101 (82.8%) White, 0 (0.0%) African American, 3 (2.5%) Native American, 0 (0.0%) Asian, 0 (0.0%) Pacific Islander, 0 (0.0%) from other races, and 18 (14.8%) from two or more races. Hispanic or Latino of any race were 4 persons (3.3%).

The Census reported that 122 people (100% of the population) lived in households, 0 (0%) lived in non-institutionalized group quarters, and 0 (0%) were institutionalized.

There were 55 households, out of which 18 (32.7%) had children under the age of 18 living in them, 10 (18.2%) were opposite-sex married couples living together, 9 (16.4%) had a female householder with no husband present, 3 (5.5%) had a male householder with no wife present.  There were 8 (14.5%) unmarried opposite-sex partnerships, and 0 (0%) same-sex married couples or partnerships. 28 households (50.9%) were made up of individuals, and 10 (18.2%) had someone living alone who was 65 years of age or older. The average household size was 2.22.  There were 22 families (40.0% of all households); the average family size was 3.64.

The population was spread out, with 29 people (23.8%) under the age of 18, 19 people (15.6%) aged 18 to 24, 29 people (23.8%) aged 25 to 44, 33 people (27.0%) aged 45 to 64, and 12 people (9.8%) who were 65 years of age or older.  The median age was 33.0 years. For every 100 females, there were 106.8 males.  For every 100 females age 18 and over, there were 97.9 males.

The homeowner vacancy rate was 0%; the rental vacancy rate was 0%.  59 people (48.4% of the population) lived in owner-occupied housing units and 63 people (51.6%) lived in rental housing units.

Politics

References

External links
 http://northmendo.com/lvfd/
 https://web.archive.org/web/20080516084039/http://mendosearch.com/cityinfo-city_name-Leggett.htm

Census-designated places in Mendocino County, California
Census-designated places in California